Tina Kellegher (born 1967 in Cavan), is an Irish actress, best known for her work in film and television in the 1990s. She currently plays Ger Lynch in the RTÉ soap opera Fair City.

Early career 
Kellegher began in theatre, working in Galway in the late 1980s, where she played a variety of roles with the Druid Theatre Company. She also worked with the Abbey Theatre playing, among other roles, Nora Clitheroe in the highly acclaimed production of The Plough and the Stars, opposite Aidan Kelly in 2004.

In 1993 she landed a small role in the Jim Sheridan movie In the Name of the Father. Also in this year, she was cast in one of the roles for which she would become best known: Sharon Curley in Stephen Frears' 1993 film The Snapper. Playing the role of a young woman from a working-class Dublin family dealing with an unintended pregnancy opposite Colm Meaney, she won a British Comedy Award and a best actress award at the Valladolid International Film Festival. The film remains hugely popular in Ireland and was the seventh highest-rated Irish film on Rotten Tomatoes in 2018, a quarter of a century after its initial release. Following this success, she was cast in Scarlett (TV miniseries), which was the most expensive TV miniseries ever made at the time.

In 1996, she joined the BBC television series Ballykissangel as Niamh Quigley, the role for which she is best known, for which she won an IFTA.

Post Ballykissangel 
After Ballykissangel she mostly worked in theatre and took smaller roles in TV productions. She is also a well-known voice on BBC Radio 4, having played policewoman Tina Mahon in the first four series of Baldi.

She is married to Gordon Wycherley, location manager on, among other projects, Ballykissangel. They have two sons, Michael, who was born in 2003, and Brian, who was born in 2007. Her brother-in-law is fellow Ballykissangel star Don Wycherley. Kellegher is currently based in Mullingar, County Westmeath, where she is a member of the North Westmeath Hospice committee.

Filmography

Film

Television

Awards and nominations

References

External links

1967 births
Living people
Irish television actresses
Irish radio actresses
Actresses from Dublin (city)